Aepus gallaecus is a species of beetle in the family Carabidae, that is endemic to Spain.

References

Beetles described in 1926
Trechinae